John Baker  (1726–30 April 1771) was an English flowerpainter.

Life
Baker was mainly employed in the decoration of coaches. His biographer Edward Edwards, in his Anecdotes of Painters (1808), remarks on the effect of fashion in this area of art, and on Baker's high reputation in it, in his day. On the foundation of the Royal Academy John Baker was elected a member.

References

.

External links
 
 Profile on the Royal Academy site

1726 births
1771 deaths
20th-century English painters
English male painters
Royal Academicians
20th-century English male artists